Freightdynamics is a subsidiary of South Africa's state-owned transport giant Transnet. 
 
The company operates four main terminals: Johannesburg, Cape Town, Port Elizabeth and Durban.

See also 
Intermodal freight transport

External links
Freightdynamics

Companies based in Johannesburg
Transport operators of South Africa